Drill is the debut EP by the English rock band Radiohead, released in May 1992. It was Radiohead's first commercial release, and debuted on the UK Album Chart at number 101. Radiohead later rerecorded three of its songs for their debut album, Pablo Honey (1993).

Background

The members of Radiohead met while attending Abingdon School, an independent school for boys in Abingdon, England. In 1985, they formed , the name referring to their usual rehearsal day in the school's music room. They recorded demos including the Manic Hedgehog tape. In late 1991, Radiohead signed a six-album recording contract with EMI and changed their name at EMI's request; "Radiohead" was taken from the song "Radio Head" on the Talking Heads album True Stories (1986).

Recording 
Radiohead recorded Drill at Courtyard Studios in Oxon, England. It was produced by Radiohead's managers, Chris Hufford. Hufford said this was a mistake, as it created a conflict of interest and generated friction in the studio. Drill featured two new recordings, "Prove Yourself" and "Stupid Car"; the other songs were taken from Radiohead's Manic Hedgehog demo.

Release
"Prove Yourself" was played on BBC Radio 1 by Gary Davies, Radiohead's first national radio exposure in the UK. Drill was released on 5 May, 1992. It reached number 101 on the UK Singles Chart; the Guardian described this as an "inauspicious start" that was "largely ignored". The music journalist Mac Randall wrote later: "Even as early as 1992, Thom Yorke's graceful, arrestingly plaintive vocal style was well developed, far more so than the band’s songwriting or overall sound."

Radiohead rerecorded "You", "Prove Yourself" and "Thinking About You" for their debut album, Pablo Honey (1993). Radiohead added Drill to streaming services in January 2020.

Track listing

Personnel
Credits taken from the Drill credits.
Thom Yorke – vocals, guitar
Jonny Greenwood – guitar
Ed O'Brien – guitar, backing vocals
Colin Greenwood – bass guitar
Philip Selway – drums
Chris Hufford — production and engineering
Tim Baldwin — mixing

References

1992 debut EPs
Radiohead EPs
Parlophone EPs